The 1986–87 season was the 89th season of association football in the Football League played by Derby County F.C., an English football club based in Derby, Derbyshire. Their third-place finish in the 1985–86 season meant they were promoted to the second tier. Arthur Cox was the manager for his third season in charge. Derby won the Second Division in this season.

Overview

Derby County played in three competitions in the 1986-87 season. The Football League Second Division, FA Cup, and Football League Cup. 

The league season started on 23 August 1986 and finished on 9 May 1987. Derby finished first in the Second Division and won promotion to the First Division for the following season.

They entered the FA Cup in the first round of the FA Cup and lost 1-0 to Sheffield Wednesday on 26 January 1987.

Derby entered the League Cup in the first round and were knocked out of the League Cup in the third round by Aston Villa, losing 2-1.

Players

Kit
The kit for this season was manufactured by sportswear company OSCA. The home kit was traditional white, but with yellow and blue trim on the collar and arms. The away kit had light and dark blue vertical stripes.

The main sponsor for the kit was Sportsweek. This was the only season they sponsored the shirt. By the end of the season Sportsweek had closed down and chairman Robert Maxwell's BPCC took over as shirt sponsor.

Results

Second Division

League Cup

FA Cup

References

Derby County F.C. seasons
Derby